Feline leukemia virus subgroup C cellular receptor family, member 2 is a protein that in humans is encoded by the FLVCR2 gene.

Function 

This gene encodes a member of the major facilitator superfamily. The encoded transmembrane protein is a calcium transporter. Unlike the related protein feline leukemia virus subgroup C receptor 1 (FLVCR1), the protein encoded by this locus does not bind to feline leukemia virus subgroup C envelope protein. The encoded protein may play a role in development of brain vascular endothelial cells, as mutations at this locus have been associated with proliferative vasculopathy and hydranencephaly-hydrocephaly syndrome.

References

Further reading